Stéphanie Vallée (born 24 September 1971) is a French-Canadian politician, lawyer and negotiator in Quebec.  She was a member of the National Assembly of Quebec (MNA) for the provincial riding of Gatineau from 2007 to 2018, as a member of the Quebec Liberal Party. Since 2014 she served as  Minister of Justice for Quebec, but decided to leave electoral politics as of the 2018 provincial general election.

Vallée studied at the University of Ottawa and obtained a bachelor's degree in civil law.

After working as an intern for two years, Vallée was a lawyer in Maniwaki for nearly 12 years, becoming a member of the Barreau du Quebec in 1995, and serving as a Member of the Conseil du Barreau of the former city of Hull. She also worked as a chief negotiator at the federal Department of Indian Affairs. In the 2007 election, she stood as the Liberal candidate for Gatineau, replacing outgoing incumbent MNA Réjean Lafrenière, who did not seek re-election.

In the election, she easily defeated five other candidates, including the Parti Québécois's Therese Yiel-Dery, Action democratique du Quebec's Martin Otis, the Green Party's Gail Walker (a former federal candidate), Quebec Solidaire's Carmen Boucher and the Marxist–Leninist candidate Lisa Leblanc. She was named the Parliamentary Secretary for the Minister of Education, Sport and Leisure, portfolios under the responsibility of Michelle Courchesne.

She was successfully re-elected in 2012 and again in 2014. In 2014, she was named Minister of Justice and Minister responsible for the Outaouais.

Heavily involved in cultural affairs, she is a member of the Administration of the Gatineau Valley's Maison de la Culture. She has also worked as an administrator at a local community radio station CHGA-FM.

Electoral record

References

External links
 

Living people
Quebec Liberal Party MNAs
Lawyers in Quebec
University of Ottawa alumni
Women MNAs in Quebec
1971 births
University of Ottawa Faculty of Law alumni
Canadian lawyers
Canadian women lawyers
People from Maniwaki
Politicians from Sherbrooke
Justice ministers of Quebec
21st-century Canadian politicians
21st-century Canadian women politicians
Women government ministers of Canada
Members of the Executive Council of Quebec